Jhulaghat (Kumaoni-Doteli:झुलाघाट) is a small suspension bridge over Kali river on Indo-Nepal border between Uttarakhand and Sudurpashchim. Uttarakhand is a state of India west of the Kali river while Sudurpashchim is a province of Nepal, east of Kali. Jhulaghat is an indo-aryan language word which literally means "Hanging pier". The landmark is known as Jhulaghat after the suspension bridge. The suspension bridge is small in size so only pedestrian, cyclist and biker can cross the border through it. There has been a small town emerged both side of the bridge. The town emerged Indian side of the bridge is a part of Munakot Tehsil in Pithoragarh District of Uttarakhand and Nepalese side is a part of Dasharathchand Municipality.

Mahakali-Jhulaghat Custom Office
There is a custom station both side of the river in India and Nepal. Pithoragarh-Jhulaghat road connects the Jhulaghat to Pithoragarh which is 38 KM at distance from Jhulaghat. Naini Saini is the nearest airport which is 40 KM far by air and Kathgodam is the nearest railway station which is 310 KM at distance.

Chiyo Bhanjyang is a border point between Province No. 1 (Nepal) and Sikkim (India). The Mid-Hill highway runs. 1776 KM through Mid hills of Nepal.

References

Transit and customs posts along the India–Nepal border
India–Nepal border crossings